Sedelnikovaea is a genus of placodioid lichens in the family Lecanoraceae. The genus was circumscribed in 2015 by Sergey Kondratyuk, Min-Hye Jeong, and Jae-Seoun Hur to contain Sedelnikovaea baicalensis, the type species. Three additional species were transferred into the genus in 2019.

Sedelnikovaea resembles Protoparmeliopsis, and has a thallus that is placodioid (crustose at the centre and lobed at the periphery), and rosette-like. It has, however, a unique different ascus structure, and it is genetically distinct from Protoparmeliopsis. The genus name honours Russian lichenologist Nellia Vasiljevna Sedelnikova, "in recognition of her contribution to our knowledge of Asian lichen flora".

Species

Sedelnikovaea baicalensis 
Sedelnikovaea marginalis 
Sedelnikovaea pseudogyrophorica 
Sedelnikovaea subdiscrepans

References

Lecanoraceae
Taxa described in 2015
Lecanorales genera
Taxa named by Sergey Kondratyuk